Marcel Andrijanić (born 21 October 1992) is a German footballer who plays as a midfielder for Regionalliga Nord club SSV Jeddeloh.

References

External links
 

1992 births
Living people
German footballers
Footballers from Hamburg
Association football midfielders
2. Bundesliga players
Regionalliga players
FC St. Pauli players
KSV Hessen Kassel players
SV Rödinghausen players
TuS Erndtebrück players
SV Drochtersen/Assel players
FC Teutonia Ottensen players
SSV Jeddeloh players